Deepa Milton Sarath Dassanayake (Sinhala:සරත් දසනායක; born 13 August 1942 and died 18 November 1999), popularly known as Sarath Dassanayake, was a Sri Lankan composer, film producer and a renowned musician. One of the pioneer music composers in Sinhala cinema, Dassanayake has contributed to more than around 150 films and 600 film songs as a composer.

Personal life 
Dassanayake was born on 13 August 1942 in Katukurunda, Moratuwa as the second of the family. His father Don Dharmapala Dassanayake was a businessman. His mother Malalage Podi Nona Peiris was a teacher. He was educated at Anuruddha Vidyalaya, Nawalapitiya where his mother worked as a teacher and then attended to Nawandama Vidyalaya, Ja-Ela, Shiksadana Vidyalaya, Laksapathi and Hunumulla Central College. Finally he completed education from Horana Buddhist School (currently known as Don Pedrick Maha Vidyalaya Horana). Even though he was not good at studies, he surprisingly passed the Senior Examination in 1957. He has four siblings.

After interrupting school life, he once trained as a mechanic in a garage and as a radio reporter. Then he learned the log and typing. Afterwards, he just applied for the public health inspector exam. Having passed the preliminary inquiry, he went to the Treasury, which is near Parliament, but did not get the job.

He was married to Preethi Neela Wijesundara. He first met Neela during music classes at Government Music College known as Heywood College. Neela studied at Kadugannawa Central College and studied music at the Kandy Music Class. After that, she joined the Government College of Music and followed a six-year course. She learned esraj at the class. After the graduation, Dassanayake worked as a music teacher at Bibila Central College. Dassanayake worked as a music director and Music Inspector in Anuradhapura, Polonnaruwa, Vavuniya, Trincomalee, Jaffna districts in 1966. They married in December 1970. In 1977, he was appointed as the Deputy Director of Aesthetic Education in the Colombo District, while his wife worked as a music instructor at Lumbini Vidyalaya.

The couple has two sons - Ranga and Sanka - and one daughter, Lakmali. Elder son Ranga is a lecturer in sound administration at the University of the Visual and Performing Arts and also a film music director. Daughter Lakmali obtained a degree in English from the University of Delhi. Youngest son Sankha is a talented musician but mentally retarded.

Dassanayake died on 18 November 1999 at the age of 57 following a brief illness.

Music career
After losing every job, he finally turned to learn music. It was 8 October 1959, where he listened to a nice melody from Horana Sri Palee College. He joined with music classes conducted by music teachers Hewage Premadasa and Weerasena Gunatilleke. His best friend at the music class was Navaratne Aththanayake, who later became the husband of songstress Sujatha Aththanayake. Dassanayake finished music class as an accomplished sitar player under the teachers, K.A. Dayarathna, Lionel Edirisinghe, K.A. Dharmasiri Perera, Gunapala Perera and S.D.S. Jayasekara. He led the orchestra of the music college as well.

Dassanayake first appeared as a sitar player in the 1963 film Udarata Menike under the music direction by R. Muttusamy. Dassanayake was a regular sitar player in the films music directed by Premasiri Khemadasa. Under the guidance of Wahalle Piyathilaka, Dassanayake entered to music direction with the 1972 film Sithijaya. His second film music composing was Vishmaya directed by Charles Perera under the guidance of Somapala Leelananda. 

His most memorable music direction came through 1973 blockbuster hit Sadahatama Oba Mage where he was joined to this film by Leelananda again. The film overcomes the challenge of rescuing Sinhala cinema from the Hindustani style and copy music films of the day through a combination of innovative melodies and standalone music. Then in 1974, he produced melodies and music for the film Kasthuri Suwanda directed by Sena Samarasinghe.

He has made many changes to the music industry by producing many popular songs in the film such as "Miyuru Kalpana" and "Irata Akeekaru" in the film Dinum Kanuwa; "Paata Podak Thilakala", "Hada Viman Dorin", "Pemwathiyanne", "Lassana Lokeka Ipadila" in Kasthuri Suwanda; "Ron Soya", "Ranmasu Ran" in Awa Soya Adare; "Lokaye Wenas Wune", "Sal Sapuna", "Ira Sanda Wadala", "Mee Pirunu Suwanda" in Sangeetha and many more. And then in the three decades: seventies, eighty and nineties of Sinhala cinema moved under the music direction of Dassanayake. He was a pioneer in the creation of a new kind of fusion of Sinhala folk and Ragadhari music. Popular singers T.M. Jayarathne, Neela Wickramasinghe, Gratien Ananda and Chandralekha Perera appeared in playback singing for the first time in the films music directed by Dassanayake. He also produced the melody for the song "Samanala Mudune Siripada Simba Simba" penned by President Ranasinghe Premadasa and sung by Jothipala.

Dassanayake won Sarasaviya Awards in 1983 for the Best music direction for the films Athin Athata and then in 1984 for Sasara Chetana. Then he won the Best Music direction awards for the film Muwan Palessa in 1992 and film Chaya in 1993.

He contributed to many of the popular songs of the seventies in radio such as "Punchi Dawaswala Nindata Yaddi" sung by Sujatha Aththanayake. The song mixed with Jayamangala's singing style and simple musical rhythm provide the backdrop to the entire song as the unexpected news of a wedding journey unfolds. He has also used beautiful melodies to a number of classical songs such as "Bol Vee Ahuru" (Amradeva), "Pem Sililare" (Amara-Dayaratne), "Roossa Gaha Langa" (Vijaya), "Kande Vihare" (Chandralekha), "Serayatiyen Api" (Vijaya-Chandralekha) and "Randu Wewi Yalu Wewi" (Sunil-Chandrika).

Apart from music direction, he was also a film producer. He produced popular films Madhu Sihina, Mihidum Sihina and Aathma.

On 17 November 2015, the "Sarath Siritha and Harasara" ceremony was held at Tharangani Cinema, Bauddhaloka Mawatha, Colombo 7.

Filmography

References

External links
 කොපි නොවේ ඔර්ජිනල්
 Archives for Sarath Dasanayaka
 Rap not round good oldies- Sarath

1942 births
1999 deaths
Sinhalese musicians
Sri Lankan composers